Yoon-jung, also spelled Yoon-jeong, Youn-jeong, or Yun-jeong, is a Korean unisex given name. Its meaning depends on the hanja used to write each syllable of the name. There are 16 hanja with the reading "yoon" and 75 hanja with the reading "jung" on the South Korean government's official list of hanja which may be registered for use in given names.

People with this name include:
Huh Yoon-jung (born 1936), South Korean male footballer
Lily Lyoonjung Lee (born 1969), South Korean-born American female figure skater
Cho Youn-jeong (born 1969), South Korean female archer
Cho Yoon-jeong (born 1979), South Korean female tennis player
Jang Yoon-jeong (singer) (born 1980), South Korean female trot singer
Yoonjung Han (born 1985), South Korean-born American female pianist
Jang Yoon-jeong (Miss Korea) (born 1987), South Korean female model
Marissa Brandt (born Park Yoon-jung, 1992), South Korean-born American female ice hockey player
Jin Se-yeon (born Kim Yoon-jung, 1994), South Korean female actress

Fictional characters with this name include:
Yoon-jeong, female character in 2006–2007 South Korean television series Pure in Heart
Shin Yun-jeong, female protagonist of 2008 South Korean film Portrait of a Beauty
Go Yoon-jung, female protagonist of 2016 South Korean television series Mrs. Cop 2

See also
List of Korean given names

References

Korean unisex given names